Maurice Herriott (born 8 October 1939) is a British track and field athlete who competed mainly in the 3000 metres steeplechase. He was born in Great Wyrley, South Staffordshire.

Athletics career
He competed for Great Britain in the 1964 Summer Olympics held in Tokyo, Japan in the 3000 metre steeple chase where he won the silver medal. He also competed in the same event at the 1968 Summer Olympics in Mexico, but with less success.

He also represented England at the 1962 British Empire and Commonwealth Games, taking the silver medal in the steeplechase for England.

Nationally he ran for the Birmingham-based athletics club Sparkhill Harriers, of which he was made an honorary lifelong member.

References

1939 births
Living people
People from South Staffordshire District
English male long-distance runners
British male steeplechase runners
English male steeplechase runners
Olympic athletes of Great Britain
Olympic silver medallists for Great Britain
Athletes (track and field) at the 1964 Summer Olympics
Athletes (track and field) at the 1968 Summer Olympics
English Olympic medallists
Commonwealth Games medallists in athletics
Athletes (track and field) at the 1962 British Empire and Commonwealth Games
Athletes (track and field) at the 1966 British Empire and Commonwealth Games
Medalists at the 1964 Summer Olympics
Olympic silver medalists in athletics (track and field)
Commonwealth Games silver medallists for England
Medallists at the 1962 British Empire and Commonwealth Games